The Te Putaaraukai River is a river of the Northland Region of New Zealand's North Island. It flows north to reach the Rangaunu Harbour to the northeast of Awanui.

See also
List of rivers of New Zealand

References

Rivers of the Northland Region
Rivers of New Zealand